Dalian University of Technology (DUT), colloquially known in Chinese as Dagong, is a public research university located in Dalian, Liaoning, China, with an additional campus in Panjin, Liaoning. Established in April 1949, it is the first formal university of a new type founded by the Chinese Communist Party on the eve of the founding of the People’s Republic of China, for the construction of China's industrial system. 

Formerly called the Dalian Institute of Technology, DUT is renowned as one of the Big Four Institutes of Technology in China. In 1996, DUT started the implementation of "Project 211" construction, with the joint efforts of the Ministry of Education, Liaoning Province and Dalian City; In 2001, the university started to implement the "Project 985" Construction, by the Ministry of Education, Liaoning Province and Dalian City; In September 2017, approved by the State Council, DUT was selected into the “Double First Class University Plan”, as a Class A Double First Class University. 

As of August 2021, 13 members of Chinese Academy of Sciences and members of Chinese Academy of Engineering in full-time faculty, 38 in part-time faculty, 1 foreign member of the Chinese Academy of Science, 1 member of Royal Swedish Academy of Engineering Sciences and 10 members of the Discipline Review Group of Academic Degrees Committee of the State Council are affiliated with DUT.

Introduction
Dalian University of Technology is located in Dalian, Liaoning, with an additional campus in Panjin. Founded in 1949, DUT is one of the top national universities in China, which is a highly focused science and engineering research and education institution. It is the first formal university established for the need of economic and cultural construction of a New China after the Chinese Civil War. The Chinese calligraphy on the latest logo of the university was written by Jiang Zemin former General Secretary of the Chinese Communist Party (1989-2002).
Ranking as a first-class university in mainland China, DUT provides undergraduate and graduate instruction in engineering, natural sciences, technology, managerial science, economics and et al. DUT belongs to the "Double First-Rate", "985 project", "211 project" and the "E9 Group" of China. During the last Chinese disciplines assessment in 2017, disciplines including engineering, natural sciences, management, economics, et al. ranks highly among Chinese top universities. DUT's business education institutions are accredited by AACSB, CAMEA and EQUIS, one of eight Universities in China.

History
DUT's predecessor, Dalian University, was founded in 1949. In July 1950, Dalian University was split into Dalian Institute of Technology (DIT) and Dalian Medical College (now Dalian Medical University). Qu Bochuan, the president of DIT, moved the university's main campus to the bay area of suburban Dalian.

In October 1960, DIT became one of the 26 key national universities directly under the State Ministry of Education. Graduate School of DIT was established in April 1986. In March 1988, DIT changed its name into current Dalian University of Technology (DUT).

In 2007, Dalian Institute of Semiconductor Technology (DIST) was jointly set up by Intel, Dalian's municipal government, and Dalian University of Technology, and managed by the university. Intel donated an 8-inch chip producing assembly line to DUT, with a total value of US$36 million.

Academics
DUT is the home to three national key laboratories, State Key Laboratory of Structural Analysis for Industrial Equipment, State Key Laboratory of Coastal and Offshore Engineering, State Key Laboratory of Fine Chemicals and the home to three Education Ministry Key Laboratories, Key Laboratory of  Materials Modification by Laser, Ion and Electron Beams, Key Laboratory of Technology Precision and Non-traditional Machining and  Key Laboratory of Industrial Ecology and Environmental Technology. It also owns one National-level Technical Transfer Center.

There are currently 14 members of Chinese Academy of Engineering or of Sciences as full-time faculty in DUT, including Qiu Dahong, Zhong Wanxie, Cheng Gengdong, Wang Liding, Lin Gao, Zhao Guofan, Wang Zhongtuo, Ou Jinping, Shen Changyu, Guo Dongming and Jian Xigao.

There are 21 national key disciplines granted by the Ministry of Education of China, including:
 Chemical Engineering
 Mechanics 
 Civil Engineering 
 Mechanical Engineering 
 Mathematics 
 Environmental Engineering 
 Management 

First-Class Discipline with PhD degree programs ranked by the Ministry of Education from 2007 to 2009:
Chemical Engineering 3rd; Management 5th; Mechanics 8th; Mechanical Engineering 10th; Civil Engineering 6th; Hydraulic Engineering 5th; Naval Architecture and Ocean Engineering 5th.

Since 1978, DUT has won almost 1,000 awards for its achievements in scientific and technological researches, eleven of which were National Natural Science Awards, nine National Invention Awards, and 30 awards in science and technology.

Lingshui Campus (main campus)
The total area of the university is 4,550 acres. The main campus includes sport sites, a hospital, and a hotel. The Liu Changchun sports stadium and gym held the international women's volleyball tournament in 2004. In 2010, three new buildings were completed to the west of the campus, including the state-of-the-art Lingxi Library, named after the former DUT president and academician, Qian Lingxi.

Panjin Campus
A new campus, the Panjin Campus was established in Panjin, Liaoning in 2013.

International academic exchange
DUT has been active in academic exchange and cooperation home and abroad. DUT has signed academic agreements with more than 128 institutions of higher education or scientific research in more than 21 countries and regions.

See also
 Dalian University of Technology Press

References

External links

DUT official website 
School Profile

 
Universities and colleges in Dalian
Educational institutions established in 1949
1949 establishments in China
Vice-ministerial universities in China